Chrysophthalmum is a genus of flowering plants in the family Asteraceae.

 Species
 Chrysophthalmum dichotomum Boiss. & Heldr.	- Turkey
 Chrysophthalmum gueneri Aytaç & Anderb.	- Turkey
 Chrysophthalmum leptocladum Rech.f.- Iran
 Chrysophthalmum montanum (DC.) Boiss. - Turkey, Iraq

References

Asteraceae genera
Inuleae